Jean-Louis Comolli (30 July 1941 – 19 May 2022) was a French writer, editor, and film director.

Career
Comolli was editor in chief of Cahiers du cinéma from 1966 to 1978, during which period he wrote the influential essays "Machines of the Visible" (1971) and "Technique and Ideology: Camera, Perspective, Depth of Field" (1971–72), both of which have been translated in English anthologies of film and media studies. This work was important in the discussion on apparatus theory, an attempt to rethink cinema as a site for the production and maintenance of dominant state ideology in the wake of May 1968.

After his tenure at Cahiers, Comolli continued his work as a director and has since published numerous works on film theory, documentary, and jazz.  He taught film theory at the Universities of Paris VIII, Barcelona, Strasburg and Genève.

In the spring of 2008, Comolli was invited to the Visions du réel documentary film festival in Nyon, Switzerland, where he developed his theory of documentary cinema.

Select filmography
 1968: Les deux Marseillaises (co-director: André S. Labarthe)
 1969: Comme je te veux
 1975: La Cecilia
 1981: L'Ombre rouge
 1983: Balles perdues
 1986: Le Bal d'Irène (TV)
 1987: Pétition (TV)
 1989: Marseille de père en fils - Coup de mistral
 1989: Marseille de père en fils - Ombres sur la ville
 1992: La Campagne de Provence
 1993: Marseille en mars
 1994: Jeune fille au livre
 1995: Georges Delerue (TV)
 1996: Marseille contre Marseille
 1997: Nos deux Marseillaises
 1997: La Question des alliances
 2000: Durruti, portrait d'un anarchiste
 2003: Rêves de France à Marseille
 2004: Les Esprits du Koniambo (TV)
 2005: Le Peintre, le poète et l'historien (TV)

Select bibliography
 "Machines of the Visible."  in Electronic Culture: Technology and Visual Representation, ed. Timothy Druckrey.  Aperture Press (1996 [1971]).
 "Technique and Ideology: Camera, Perspective, Depth of Field.” in Narrative, Apparatus, Ideology: A Film Theory Reader, ed. Philip Rosen.  Columbia University Press (1986 [1972]).

References

External links
 Audio interview with Jean-Louis Comolli (in French)

1941 births
2022 deaths
French film directors
French male screenwriters
French screenwriters
French film critics
French male non-fiction writers
Cahiers du Cinéma editors
Pieds-Noirs
People from Skikda